Marcus J. Anderson (born June 12, 1959) is a former American football wide receiver. He was signed by the Chicago Bears as an undrafted free agent in 1981. He played college football at Tulane University.

Professional career 
Anderson attended LaGrange High School in Lake Charles, Louisiana. Anderson finished his undergraduate degree at Tulane University in Education and communication.

Anderson scored ten touch downs during his time at Tulane from 1977 - 1980.

Anderson played for the Chicago Bears and scored two touchdowns in 1981. His best game came on Monday Night Football in a road contest against the Detroit Lions where he caught six passes for 176 yards. Anderson scored one long touchdown in the game and made another catch going down at the one-yard line to set up another Bears touchdown.

Anderson played for the Chicago Blitz and led the team with 50 catches for 940 yards with 5 TDs.  Playing for the New Jersey Generals from 1983 - 1985.

References

External links 
Pro Football Reference

1959 births
Living people
Sportspeople from Port Arthur, Texas
American football wide receivers
Tulane Green Wave football players
Chicago Bears players
Chicago Blitz players
New Jersey Generals players
Players of American football from Texas